This page is a list of Catalan saints, blesseds, venerables, and Servants of God, as recognized by the Roman Catholic Church. These people were born, died, or lived their religious life in the Autonomous Community of Catalonia.

The history of the Catholic Church in Catalonia may date back to the earliest times, with visits of Paul and James.  (The apparition of the Blessed Virgin to Saint James (Our Lady of the Pillar) occurred in neighboring Aragon.)  The written record dates to the third century, with the Acts of the Martyrdom of the bishop Fructuosus and his deacons Augurius and Eulogius.

List of saints

 Anthony Mary Claret
 Carmen Salles y Barangueras
 Enrique de Ossó i Cervelló
 Eulalia of Barcelona
 Felix of Girona
 Francesc Gil de Federich de Sans (of the Martyrs of Vietnam)
 Francisco Coll Guitart
 Fructuosus of Tarragona
 Jaime Hilario Barbal
 Joaquim Masmitjà
 Joaquina Vedruna de Mas
 Josep Manyanet i Vives
 Joseph Oriol
 Justus of Urgell
 Maginus
 Michael de Sanctis
 Miguel Febres Cordero
 Nebridius
 Olegarius
 Ot of Urgell
 Pacian
 Paula Montal Fornés
 Pere Josep Almato Ribera Auras (of the Martyrs of Vietnam)
 Peter Claver
 Peter Nolasco
 Peter Sanz
 Raymond of Penyafort
 Raymond Nonnatus
 Rosa Francisca Dolors Molas Vallvé
 Salvador of Horta
 Severus of Barcelona
 Teresa Jornet Ibars

The patron saint of Catalonia is Saint George; there he is known as Sant Jordi.

Other people have been canonized saints who, while Catalan by language or ancestry, were not from the modern community of Catalonia.  An example is Junípero Serra.  Also of interest, from the culturally and linguistically Catalan nation of Andorra, would be Mary as Our Lady of Meritxell.

List of blesseds

 Thomas ‘Bookish Blessed’ Colleran
 Andres Sola Molist (of the Saints of the Cristero War)
 Anna Maria Janer Anglarill
 Francisco Castellet Vinale (Domingo) (of the Martyrs of Japan)
 Francisco Palau
 Josep Tous Soler
 Juan Santamarta (of the Martyrs of Japan)
 Luis Exarch (Luis Bertran) (of the Martyrs of Japan)
 Manuel Domingo y Sol
 Maria Angela Astorch
 María Rafols Bruna
 Martyrs of the Spanish Civil War
 Joan Roig i Diggle
 Andreu Carrio Bertran
 Bartomeu Arbona Estades
 Braulio Martinez Simon
 Candido Rivera y Rivera (Pedro)
 Constanti March Battles
 Demetrio Zurbitu Recalde
 Dionisio Vicente Ramos
 Eugenio Remon Salvador (Miguel)
 Federico Lopez y Lopez (Alfonso)
 Felipe Iriondo Amundarain
 Felix Cots Olivera
 Francesc Audi Cid
 Francisco Javier Tena Colom
 Francisco Remon Jativa
 Gertrudis rita Florencia Suris Brusola (Maria Dolors)
 Isabel Ferrer Sabria
 Jaume Noguera Baro
 Joaquim Maria Valenti de Marti
 Joan Guix Marsal
 Joan Rovira Orlandis
 Jose Roma Carres
 Josep Munoz Albiol
 Josep Antoni Verges de Trias
 Josep Llatje Blanch
 Josep Sampol Escalas
 Josepa Mongoche Homs (Maria de L'Asuncio)
 Lluis Bogunya Porta
 Lorenzo Isla Sanz
 Manuel Peypock Sala
 Maria Dolors Llimona Planas (Maria de Montserrat)
 Miquel Mendoza Reig
 Modesto Vegas y Vegas
 Pedro Bruch Cotacans
 Ramon Artigues Sirvent
 Teresa Jimenez Baldovi (Maria del Socors)
 Pere Tarrés i Claret
 Peregrina Mogas Fontcuberta

List of venerables

 Caterina Coromina i Agustí
 Dorotea Chopitea Villota Serra
 Esperanca Gonzalez Puig (Maria Esperanca of Jesus)
 Filomena Ferrer Galcerán
 Jacint Alegre i Pujals
 Jaume Clotet Fabres
 Joaquina Maria Mercedes Barcelo Pages
 José Gras y Granollers
 Josep Torras i Bages
 Juan Bonal Cortada
 Juan Collell Cuatrecasas
 Lliberada Ferrarons i Vives
 Magi Morera Feixas
 Maria Antonia Paris
 Maria del Carmen Albarracín Pascual
 Maria Guell Puig
 Maria Llorença Llong
 Maria Rosa Teresa Gay Tibau
 Montserrat Grases
 Paula Delpuig Gelabert (Paula of Saint Aloysius)
 Rosa Ojeda Creus
 Saturnina Jassa Fontcuberta
 Teresa Gallifa Palmarola
 Teresa Guasch Toda (Teresa of the Immaculate Heart of Mary)
 Teresa Toda Juncosa (Teresa of Saint Joseph)

List of Servants of God

 Adolfo Rodríguez Vidal
 Angela Margarida Prat (Angela Serafina)
 Angelo Cantons Fornells
 Anna Maria Ravell Barrera
 Anna Narcisa Maria Soler Pi (Anna od Saint Sabina)
 Antoni Gaudí
 Bartomeu M. (Baldiri) Xiberta i Roqueta
 Buenaventura Codina y Augerolas
 Carme Badosa Cuartrecasas (Arcangela)
 Carme Sala Bigas (Maria Lourdes)
 Catalina de Balmaseda y San Martín
 Claudio López Bru
 Coloma Antonia Marti Valls (Francesca of the Wounds of Christ)
 Diego Penalosa (of the Martyrs of La Florida)
 Encarnacio Colomina Agusti
 Enrique Pélach y Feliú
 Enrqiqueta Radon Asencio (Maria Teresa)
 Eduardo Laforet Dorda
 Francesc Crusats Franch
 Francesc Sagrera Riera
 Francesc Xavier Butinyà i Hospital
 Francisco Barrecheguren Montaeut
 Francois-Benjamin May
 Gertrudis Castanyet Seda
 Guillem Rovirosa Albet
 Isabel Ventosa Reig
 Jose Maria Gran Cirera (Of the Martyrs of Guatemala)
 José María Hernández Garnica
 Jose Maria Pujadas Ferrer
 Jose María Vilaseca
 Josefina Vilaseca Alsina
 Josep Maria Cases Deordal
 Juan Fonte, of the Jesuit Martyrs Companions of Fernando de Santaren
 Magdalena Aulina Saurina
 Magin Catalá
 Marc Castanyer Seda
 Maria Benedicta Daiber Heyne
 Maria Carme Surruca de Pastors
 Maria del Carme de Sojo Ballester de Anguera
 Maria Cristina Alonso y Alonso (Maria Cristina of the Eucharist)
 Maximina Garcia Presa (Maximina of Jesus Crucified)
 Miquel Palau Vila
 Pere Marcer Cusco
 Ramon Strauch i Vidal
 Rosa Deulofeu Gonzalez

Other open causes

See also
 List of saints of the Canary Islands
 Roman Catholic Archdiocese of Barcelona
 Roman Catholic Diocese of Sant Feliu de Llobregat
 Roman Catholic Diocese of Terrassa
 Roman Catholic Archdiocese of Tarragona
 Roman Catholic Diocese of Girona
 Roman Catholic Diocese of Lleida
 Roman Catholic Diocese of Solsona
 Roman Catholic Diocese of Tortosa
 Roman Catholic Diocese of Urgell
 Roman Catholic Diocese of Vic

References

External links
"Hagiography Circle"

 
Catholic Church in Spain
Catalonia

Saints
Saints